The Bolognese Republic was proclaimed in 1796 in the Central Italian city of Bologna.

History
It was a French client republic established when Papal authorities escaped from the city of Bologna in June 1796. It was annexed by the Cispadane Republic on 16 October 1796.

It was given the first Jacobin Constitution written in Italy. It had a government consisting of nine consuls and its head of state was the Presidente del Magistrato, i.e. Chief magistrate, a presiding office held for four months by one of the consuls.

References

External links
WorldStatesmen - Italy

History of Bologna
Client states of the Napoleonic Wars
1796 in Italy
Early Modern Italy
1796 establishments in Italy
1796 disestablishments in Italy